48th New York Film Critics Circle Awards
January 30, 1983

Best Picture: 
 Gandhi 
The 48th New York Film Critics Circle Awards honored the best filmmaking of 1982. The winners were announced on 20 December 1982 and the awards were given on 30 January 1983.

Winners
Best Actor:
Ben Kingsley - Gandhi
Runners-up: Dustin Hoffman - Tootsie and Peter O'Toole - My Favorite Year
Best Actress:
Meryl Streep - Sophie's Choice
Runners-up: Diane Keaton - Shoot the Moon and Jessica Lange - Frances
Best Cinematography:
Néstor Almendros - Sophie's Choice
Runners-up: Philippe Rousselot - Diva and Jordan Cronenweth - Blade Runner
Best Director:
Sydney Pollack - Tootsie
Runner-up: Steven Spielberg - E.T. the Extra-Terrestrial
Best Film:
Gandhi
Runners-up: Tootsie, E.T. the Extra-Terrestrial and Missing
Best Foreign Language Film:
Time Stands Still (Megáll az idö) • Hungary
Runners-up: Le Beau Mariage • France  and Three Brothers (Tre fratelli) • Italy/France
Best Screenplay:
Larry Gelbart and Murray Schisgal - Tootsie
Runner-up: Barry Levinson - Diner
Best Supporting Actor:
John Lithgow - The World According to Garp
Runners-up: George Gaynes - Tootsie and Robert Preston - Victor Victoria
Best Supporting Actress:
Jessica Lange - Tootsie
Runner-up: Glenn Close - The World According to Garp

References

External links
1982 Awards

1982
New York Film Critics Circle Awards, 1982
New York Film Critics Circle Awards
New York Film Critics Circle Awards
New York Film Critics Circle Awards
New York Film Critics Circle Awards